Hendrefoilan is an area in Swansea, South Wales. The area overlaps northwest Sketty and east Killay communities.

The western part is often known as Student Village which lies is on the west bank of the Olchfa Stream, in the suburb of Killay. It is part of a Satellite Campus of Swansea University. The student village consists of a number of student flats, which are let out to university students.

History

The main feature on the campus is Hendrefoelan House, a large private house built in 1853 by William B. Colling for Lewis Llewelyn Dillwyn (1814-92) then the Member of Parliament for Swansea and home for many years to his daughter, the novelist and industrialist Amy Dillwyn. The house housed the South Wales Miners' Library from the 1980s until 2006, when it was moved to the Coach House, also on the campus. Hendrefoelan House, on Hendrefoilan Road, is a severe grey stone mansion in the Tudor style, built c. 1860 for Lewis Llewelyn Dillwyn, MP for Swansea, by William B. Colling. It formerly housed the Adult Education Department of Swansea University, but is now derelict.

The eastern part is sometimes known as the "Hendrefoilan Estate". It is within the community of Sketty, and part of the Tycoch electoral Polling District, although would not be considered "culturally" part of Tycoch. The area has an SA2 7** postcode, and is hence considered by Royal Mail to be within the Killay/Dunvant area. It is bounded by the Olchfa Stream to the west, the Gower Road to the south, and University Perimeter fence and Hendrefoilan Road to the north. The area consists of suburban housing.

References

Districts of Swansea
Swansea University
Student quarters